The 2011 season for  began in January at the Tour Down Under and ended in October at the Japan Cup. As a UCI ProTeam, they were automatically invited and obligated to send a squad to every event in the UCI World Tour.

2011 roster
Ages as of January 1, 2011.

Riders who joined the team for the 2011 season

Riders who left the team during or after the 2010 season

One-day races
For the first time since 2004, Petacchi did not win the Gran Premio della Costa Etruschi, as the six-time reigning champion did not ride the event. The squad's highest finisher was Gavazzi, who was eighth in the mass sprint finish. Later in February, Pietropolli won the Trofeo Laigueglia after making a late-forming ten-rider selection, and winning the sprint. He noted after the race that he had, in his career, finished in every position from second through tenth in the Trofeo Laigueglia, and could now finally add first.

Spring classics
At the first monument race of the season, Milan–San Remo, the team had to alter their plans based on how the race played out. A crash occurred on the Le Manie climb  from the finish of the race, and the group that was left behind never fully caught up to those who avoided the crash. Petacchi, who had won the event in 2005, made the split, but Scarponi did not. While Petacchi would ostensibly be a strong favorite for a sprint finish from a depleted front group, Scarponi put in an intensive effort on the Cipressa, the day's penultimate climb, to bridge from the second group up to the first. He later said he did this with Petacchi's blessing. Once in the front group, Scarponi easily made the next selection, taking place on the Poggio, which led to eight riders finishing together at the front of the race. The pace of this split was too hard for Petacchi, and he finished 12th, 27 seconds back. Scarponi hit out early from the leading group of eight to try for victory, but he was easily overhauled by most of the group, finishing sixth on the day. On the same day as the monument classic Paris–Roubaix, Cunego won the Giro dell'Appennino race, outsprinting Emanuele Sella at the front of a seven-rider leading group. Lampre-ISD was the only UCI ProTeam in the race.

The team also sent squads to the Gran Premio dell'Insubria-Lugano, the Gran Premio di Lugano, E3 Prijs Vlaanderen – Harelbeke, Gent–Wevelgem, the Tour of Flanders, the Scheldeprijs, Paris–Roubaix, the Amstel Gold Race, La Flèche Wallonne, Liège–Bastogne–Liège and the Giro di Toscana, but placed no higher than 12th in any of these races.

Fall races
The team also sent squads to the Gran Premio Nobili Rubinetterie, the Clásica de San Sebastián, Tre Valli Varesine, the Gran Premio Industria e Commercio Artigianato Carnaghese, the Giro della Romagna, the Grand Prix Cycliste de Québec, the Memorial Marco Pantani, the Coppa Sabatini, the Gran Premio Bruno Beghelli and Paris–Tours, but placed no higher than 11th in any of these races.

Stage races
The team got their first win of the season at the Giro della Provincia di Reggio Calabria, the first race of the year held in Italy. Pietropolli made a late selection on the uphill finish to stage 1 and won the sprint ahead of six others at the front of the race. The two succeeding stages also featured small sprint finishes, and Pietropolli made all the selections both days, ensuring his overall win. Both of the team's leaders took wins at the Giro di Sardegna in late February. Cunego won stage 2, finishing best of a small group that had also included Scarponi, who revealed after the stage that the plan was to work for Cunego should this scenario play out. It was Cunego's first victory in over a year, since a stage of the 2009 Vuelta a España. Scarponi won the race's last stage three days later with a solo attack on the uphill finale. The team had tried to make the race difficult for leader Peter Sagan, in the hopes of having Cunego surpass him in the standings. However, the young Slovak's fourth place on the day gave him the race overall, with Cunego finishing third. Scarponi and Cunego both entered Tirreno–Adriatico in March. After the stage 1 team time trial put them 37 seconds off the race lead, Scarponi took back much of that time in stage 4. For the second year in a row, he won the stage into Chieti and moved up to fourth by so doing. Cunego rode the stage's finale in the team's best interests, marking Philippe Gilbert and Cadel Evans' separate attempts to bridge up to Scarponi in first position, but not helping either. Should either have caught Scarponi, Cunego would have been in excellent position to take victory himself. When it became clear that Scarponi would win, Cunego accelerated past Evans for second, giving the team the top two places on the day. Scarponi ended the race in third overall, and won the points classification. Cunego was eighth.

Lampre-ISD did obtain two noteworthy results in the race, though. Malori won the stage 4 time trial in Crevalcore, with teammate Ulissi sixth. Sella was a minute back on the stage, but the Italian climber still had time in hand to win the race overall by 30 seconds over Ulissi in second. Ulissi won the youth classification with this performance. Petacchi took a sprint win, his first of the season, at the partly concurrent Volta a Catalunya. Stage 2 was one of the few in that race set to be decided by the sprinters, and the team brought back both the morning breakaway and a late two-man escape to set Petacchi up for the win. He had been the first across the line from the main field the day before as well, but it was only for second place behind solo winner Gatis Smukulis. In April, Scarponi won the Giro del Trentino, a race traditionally seen as one of the last tune-ups before the Giro d'Italia, without winning a stage. He limited his losses in the stage 1 individual time trial, coming home 12th at 27 seconds down on the winner Andreas Klöden. The next day, he finished 25 seconds clear of the main field, with stage winner Thomas Voeckler. He finished sufficiently near the front of the race in stages 3 and 4 to claim victory by 7 seconds over 's Tiago Machado.

Petacchi had a somewhat peculiar Presidential Cycling Tour of Turkey. The race is predominantly flat, with several stages meant to end in group sprints, though also with at least one stage hilly enough to ensure that a sprinter is not the overall winner. He had the best position near the front of the peloton in stage 1, which was setting up for a field sprint. He was unable to hold his position, coming across the line eighth, but he was subsequently given a one-minute penalty for hitting 's Nacer Bouhanni which put him dead last in the overall classification. He stayed at the front of the race for the sprint finish to stage 2, but lost to 's Valentin Iglinsky, a relatively unheralded rider. He was also defeated in the stage 3 sprint, by three riders from UCI Professional Continental teams. Stage 4 was the Tour's queen stage, and most hilly. Petacchi managed to stay with the front group over the tall climb early in the race, and stayed with the main peloton the rest of the stage. Just as they had been for the first three stages, the Lampre-ISD team was most responsible for chasing down the breakaway. Petacchi at one time actually told Pérez and Kostyuk to stop the chase, but they pressed on and caught the escapees. Petacchi and new race leader Bartosz Huzarski put in such a fast sprint for the finish line that they took a 1-second time gap over the rest of the 32-strong leading group, and Petacchi won the stage he was perhaps least likely to win. His time gap to Huzarski was 50 seconds, meaning he would have been race leader if not for the stage 1 penalty. Petacchi took the points lead with the victory, and retained it through to the conclusion of the race. At the concurrent Tour de Romandie, Cunego won the undulating second stage with a late attack on the final ascent, finishing two seconds clear of the rest of the 23-strong leading group who had only just caught a four-man breakaway.

The team also won lesser classifications at Tirreno–Adriatico, the Settimana internazionale di Coppi e Bartali, the Tour of Turkey, the Tour of Slovenia, and the Brixia Tour. The team also sent squads to the Tour Down Under, the Tour of Qatar, the Tour of Oman, Paris–Nice, the Three Days of De Panne, the Bayern-Rundfahrt, the Critérium du Dauphiné, the Tour de Pologne, the Giro di Padania and the Tour of Beijing, but did not achieve a stage win, classification win, or podium finish in any of them.

Grand Tours

Giro d'Italia

Tour de France

Vuelta a España

Season victories

Away from competition

Mantova doping investigation

Footnotes

References

2011 road cycling season by team
UAE Team Emirates
2011 in Italian sport